Boronia corynophylla is a plant in the citrus family, Rutaceae and is endemic to a small area in the south-west of Western Australia. It is a spreading shrub with thin, simple, cylindrical to narrow club-shaped leaves and pale red, four-petalled flowers in groups of up to three on the ends of the branches.

Description
The eight stamens are club-shaped with those nearest the sepals slightly longer than those near the petals.

Taxonomy and naming
Boronia corynophylla was first formally described in 1998 by Paul G. Wilson and the description was published in Nuytsia from a specimen collected in the Frank Hann National Park. The specific epithet (corynophylla) is derived from the Ancient Greek words koryne meaning "club" or "mace" and phyllon meaning "leaf", referring to the club-shaped leaves.

Distribution and habitat
This boronia grows is only known from the Frank Hann National Park where it grows in Eucalyptus salmonophloia woodland.

Conservation
Boronia corynophylla is classified as "Priority Two" by the Government of Western Australia Department of Parks and Wildlife meaning that it is poorly known and known from only a few locations but is not under imminent threat.

References

corynophylla
Flora of Western Australia
Plants described in 1998
Taxa named by Paul G. Wilson